Jozef Kovalík was the defending champion but chose not to defend his title.

Zdeněk Kolář won the title after defeating Kamil Majchrzak 7–6(7–4), 7–5 in the final.

Seeds

Draw

Finals

Top half

Bottom half

References

External links
Main draw
Qualifying draw

Pekao Szczecin Open - 1
2021 Singles